Charles Holt may refer to:

Charles A. Holt (born 1948), behavioral economist at the University of Virginia
Charles C. Holt, economist at the University of Texas at Austin
 Charles John Holt, better known as Jack Holt (actor)
 Charles John Holt III, better known as Tim Holt, Jack Holt's actor grandson

See also
Charles B. Holt House, a rock house in Charlottesville, Virginia
Charles Holte (disambiguation)